Girls at Sea may refer to:

 Girls at Sea (1958 film), a 1958 British film
 Girls at Sea (1977 film), a 1977 Danish film